Jadavpur Bijoygarh Shikshaniketan is a school in South Kolkata, India.

History
The school was established in 1951. The school's medium of instruction is Bengali, with Bengali taught as main language. It is affiliated by the West Bengal Board of Secondary Education and the West Bengal Council of Higher Secondary Education.

See also
Education in India
List of schools in India
Education in West Bengal

References

External links

High schools and secondary schools in West Bengal
Schools in Kolkata
Educational institutions established in 1951
1951 establishments in West Bengal